Morriston East railway station served the community of Morriston, in the historical county of Glamorganshire, Wales, from 1871 to 1950 on the Swansea Vale Railway.

History 
The station was opened on 2 October 1871 by the Swansea Vale Railway. It was originally a terminus but it was resited as a through station on 1 March 1875. Its name was changed to Morriston East in January 1950. It closed on 25 September 1950.

References 

Disused railway stations in Swansea
Railway stations in Great Britain opened in 1871
Railway stations in Great Britain closed in 1950
1871 establishments in Wales
1950 disestablishments in Wales